Physical properties of materials and systems can often be categorized as being either intensive or extensive, according to how the property changes when the size (or extent) of the system changes. According to IUPAC, an intensive quantity is one whose magnitude is independent of the size of the system, whereas an extensive quantity is one whose magnitude is additive for subsystems.

The terms intensive and extensive quantities were introduced into physics by German writer Georg Helm in 1898, and by American physicist and chemist Richard C. Tolman in 1917.

An intensive property does not depend on the system size or the amount of material in the system. It is not necessarily homogeneously distributed in space; it can vary from place to place in a body of matter and radiation. Examples of intensive properties include temperature, T; refractive index, n; density, ρ; and hardness, η.

By contrast, extensive properties such as the mass, volume and entropy of systems are additive for subsystems.

Not all properties of matter fall into these two categories. For example, the square root of the volume is neither intensive nor extensive. For example if a system is doubled in size by juxtaposing a second identical system, the value of an intensive property equals the value for each subsystem and the value of an extensive property is twice the value for each subsystem. However the property √V is instead multiplied by √2 .

Intensive properties
An intensive property is a physical quantity whose value does not depend on the amount of substance which was measured. The most obvious intensive quantities are ratios of extensive quantities. In a homogeneous system divided into two halves, all its extensive properties, in particular its volume and its mass, are divided into two halves. All its intensive properties, such as the mass per volume (mass density) or volume per mass (specific volume), must remain the same in each half.

The temperature of a system in thermal equilibrium is the same as the temperature of any part of it, so temperature is an intensive quantity. If the system is divided by a wall that is permeable to heat or to matter, the temperature of each subsystem is identical. Additionally, the boiling temperature of a substance is an intensive property. For example, the boiling temperature of water is 100 °C at a pressure of one atmosphere, regardless of the quantity of water remaining as liquid.

Any extensive quantity "E" for a sample can be divided by the sample's volume, to become the "E density" for the sample;
similarly, any extensive quantity "E" can be divided by the sample's mass, to become the sample's "specific E";
extensive quantities "E" which have been divided by the number of moles in their sample are referred to as "molar E".

The distinction between intensive and extensive properties has some theoretical uses.  For example, in thermodynamics, the state of a simple compressible system is completely specified by two independent, intensive properties, along with one extensive property, such as mass. Other intensive properties are derived from those two intensive variables.

Examples
Examples of intensive properties include:

 charge density, ρ (or ne)
 chemical potential, μ
 color
 concentration, c
 energy density, ρ
 magnetic permeability, μ
 mass density, ρ  (or specific gravity)
 melting point and boiling point
 molality, m or b
 pressure, p
 refractive index
 specific conductance (or electrical conductivity)
 specific heat capacity, cp
 specific internal energy, u
 specific rotation, [α]
 specific volume, v
 standard reduction potential, E°
 surface tension
 temperature, T
 thermal conductivity
 velocity v
 viscosity
See List of materials properties for a more exhaustive list specifically pertaining to materials.

Extensive properties
An extensive property is a physical quantity whose value is proportional to the size of the system it describes, or to the quantity of matter in the system. For example, the mass of a sample is an extensive quantity; it depends on the amount of substance. The related intensive quantity is the density which is independent of the amount. The density of water is approximately 1g/mL whether you consider a drop of water or a swimming pool, but the mass is different in the two cases.

Dividing one extensive property by another extensive property generally gives an intensive value—for example: mass (extensive) divided by volume (extensive) gives density (intensive).

Examples 
Examples of extensive properties include:

 amount of substance, n
 enthalpy, H
 entropy, S
 Gibbs energy, G
 heat capacity, Cp
 Helmholtz energy, A or F
 internal energy, U
 spring stiffness, K
 mass, m
 volume, V

Conjugate quantities
In thermodynamics, some extensive quantities measure amounts that are conserved in a thermodynamic process of transfer. They are transferred across a wall between two thermodynamic systems or subsystems. For example, species of matter may be transferred through a semipermeable membrane. Likewise, volume may be thought of as transferred in a process in which there is a motion of the wall between two systems, increasing the volume of one and decreasing that of the other by equal amounts.

On the other hand, some extensive quantities measure amounts that are not conserved in a thermodynamic process of transfer between a system and its surroundings. In a thermodynamic process in which a quantity of energy is transferred from the surroundings into or out of a system as heat, a corresponding quantity of entropy in the system respectively increases or decreases, but, in general, not in the same amount as in the surroundings. Likewise, a change in the amount of electric polarization in a system is not necessarily matched by a corresponding change in electric polarization in the surroundings.

In a thermodynamic system, transfers of extensive quantities are associated with changes in respective specific intensive quantities. For example, a volume transfer is associated with a change in pressure. An entropy change is associated with a temperature change. A change in the amount of electric polarization is associated with an electric field change. The transferred extensive quantities and their associated respective intensive quantities have dimensions that multiply to give the dimensions of energy. The two members of such respective specific pairs are mutually conjugate. Either one, but not both, of a conjugate pair may be set up as an independent state variable of a thermodynamic system. Conjugate setups are associated by Legendre transformations.

Composite properties
The ratio of two extensive properties of the same object or system is an intensive property. For example, the ratio of an object's mass and volume, which are two extensive properties, is density, which is an intensive property.

More generally properties can be combined to give new properties, which may be called derived or composite properties. For example, the base quantities mass and volume can be combined to give the derived quantity density. These composite properties can sometimes also be classified as intensive or extensive. If the size of the system is changed by some scaling factor, only the extensive properties will change, since intensive properties are independent of the size of the system.

Intensive properties are independent of the size of the system, so the property F is an intensive property if for all values of the scaling factor,

It follows, for example, that the ratio of two extensive properties is an intensive property. To illustrate, consider a system having a certain mass, and volume, . The density,  is equal to mass (extensive) divided by volume (extensive):  .

The property  is an extensive property if for all ,

It follows from Euler's homogeneous function theorem that

where the partial derivative is taken with all parameters constant except . This last equation can be used to derive thermodynamic relations.

Specific properties

A specific property is the intensive property obtained by dividing an extensive property of a system by its mass.  For example, heat capacity is an extensive property of a system.  Dividing heat capacity, by the mass of the system gives the specific heat capacity, which is an intensive property.  When the extensive property is represented by an upper-case letter, the symbol for the corresponding intensive property is usually represented by a lower-case letter.  Common examples are given in the table below.

 *Specific volume is the reciprocal of density.

If the amount of substance in moles can be determined, then each of these thermodynamic properties may be expressed on a molar basis, and their name may be qualified with the adjective  molar, yielding terms such as molar volume, molar internal energy, molar enthalpy, and molar entropy. The symbol for molar quantities may be indicated by adding a subscript "m" to the corresponding extensive property.

For the characterization of substances or reactions, tables usually report the molar properties referred to a standard state. In that case an additional superscript  is added to the symbol. Examples:
  =  is the molar volume of an ideal gas at standard conditions for temperature and pressure.
  is the standard molar heat capacity of a substance at constant pressure.
  is the standard enthalpy variation of a reaction (with subcases: formation enthalpy, combustion enthalpy...).
  is the standard reduction potential of a redox couple, i.e. Gibbs energy over charge, which is measured in volt = J/C.

Limitations

The general validity of the division of physical properties into extensive and intensive kinds has been addressed in the course of science. Redlich noted that, although physical properties and especially thermodynamic properties are most conveniently defined as either intensive or extensive, these two categories are not all-inclusive and some well-defined concepts like the square-root of a volume conform to neither definition.  

Other systems, for which standard definitions do not provide a simple answer, are systems in which the subsystems interact when combined. Redlich pointed out that the assignment of some properties as intensive or extensive may depend on the way subsystems are arranged. For example, if two identical galvanic cells are connected in parallel, the voltage of the system is equal to the voltage of each cell, while the electric charge transferred (or the electric current) is extensive. However, if the same cells are connected in series, the charge becomes intensive and the voltage extensive. The IUPAC definitions do not consider such cases.

Some intensive properties do not apply at very small sizes.  For example, viscosity is a macroscopic quantity and is not relevant for extremely small systems.  Likewise, at a very small scale color is not independent of size, as shown by quantum dots, whose color depends on the size of the "dot".

References

Physical quantities
Thermodynamic properties